Chao Liang-yen (born 9 March 1954) is a Taiwanese politician.

Education
Chao was educated at Chengcheng Elementary School and  before graduating from Kaohsiung Municipal Kaohsiung Girls' Senior High School. She then studied journalism at Chinese Culture University and later pursued a Master of Arts in political science at the same institution.

Political career
Chao served two terms on the Fongshan City Council, and was subsequently elected to the National Assembly in 1991. She remained a member of the assembly until 1996. Chao contested the 2001 legislative elections, and won election to the Legislative Yuan as a People First Party representative of Kaohsiung County. She was reelected in 2004, and stepped down from the Legislative Yuan at the end of her second term in 2008. During Chao's second term as a member of the Legislative Yuan, she frequently opined on military affairs, and served for a period as convener of the legislature's defense committee. She later served as People First Party caucus whip.

References

1954 births
Living people
Chinese Culture University alumni
Kaohsiung Members of the Legislative Yuan
Members of the 6th Legislative Yuan
Members of the 5th Legislative Yuan
People First Party Members of the Legislative Yuan
Taiwanese women journalists
21st-century Taiwanese women politicians
20th-century Taiwanese women politicians
Women local politicians in Taiwan